The 1984 Merlion Cup is the third edition of the invitational football tournament. Matches were held at the former Singapore National Stadium held from 14–28 October 1984.

Group stage

Group A

Group B

Final round

Semifinals

Third place play-off

Final

Awards

References

1982 in Singaporean football